Verlen Kruger (June 30, 1922 in Pulaski County, Indiana – August 2, 2004) was a canoe enthusiast who paddled over  in his lifetime.

Paddling
Over the course of his life, Verlen Kruger paddled the most miles (over 100,000 miles) of any single competitor in the sport. According to the Guinness Book of World Records, all the more remarkable because he did not start until age 41. Of particular note are the  Two Continent Canoe Expedition and the  Ultimate Canoe Challenge, the longest canoe journey ever.

A bronze statue of Kruger was erected on the banks of the Grand River in Portland, Michigan by family and friends in 2010.

Bibliography

Books

Video

Notes

External links

 
 Two Continent Canoe Expedition
 Ultimate Canoe Challenge

American male canoeists
1922 births
2004 deaths
People from Pulaski County, Indiana
People from Lansing, Michigan